Column I is a 1983–1984 stainless steel sculpture by James Rosati, installed on the Stanford University campus in Stanford, California, United States. The  abstract artwork was installed to commemorate Albert Elsen, an art history professor at Stanford for more than 25 years, who died in 1995. Elsen appreciated Column I and wanted the piece in Stanford's collection, but was unable to acquire the artwork before his death.

Stanford University Museum of Art's Lyn Cox said, "[The sculpture] has a good conversation with the palm trees around it. The palm trees say something about calmness and peacefulness in their own way, and 'Column I' responds in a similar but different way, resonating with them."

See also
 1984 in art

References

1984 sculptures
Abstract sculptures in California
Outdoor sculptures in California
Stanford University buildings and structures
Stainless steel sculptures in the United States
Steel sculptures in California